USS Goff (DD-247) was a Clemson-class destroyer in the United States Navy during World War II. She was named for Secretary of the Navy Nathan Goff, Jr.

Goff, built by the New York Shipbuilding Corporation, was launched 2 June 1920; sponsored by Mrs. Nathan Goff, widow of the former Secretary of the Navy; and commissioned at the Philadelphia Navy Yard on 19 January 1921.

Service history
For the first 2 years of her long service, Goff operated along the Atlantic coast, conducting battle practice and exercises in the yearly Caribbean fleet maneuvers as well as off the East Coast. In September 1922, the destroyer was detached from this duty and assigned to the Atlantic Fleet, European Waters. Departing Norfolk, Virginia, on 14 October 1922, she cruised primarily in the eastern Mediterranean, putting in at ports in Turkey, Bulgaria, Russia, Egypt, Palestine, Syria, Greece, and Romania. It was a period of great unrest in the Balkans and eastern Mediterranean: Greece and Turkey were at war, various powers were scrambling to consolidate after World War I and gain control over the now-defunct Ottoman empire, and Russia, although still wracked by the Russian Revolution and its aftermath, was seeking further territory and an outlet to the Mediterranean. The presence of American men-of-war amidst this tension assisted various relief agencies working to mitigate the damage from past and present wars as well as protect American lives, interests, and property. Refugees from the Greek and Turkish conflict were frequently evacuated and cared for by the American fleet, and Goff participated in this humanitarian service, particularly at Marsina, where from 18 to 20 July 1923 she supervised evacuation of hundreds of Turkish refugees.

Returning to the United States on 11 August, Goff engaged in battle problems and tactical exercises off the East Coast and then on 3 January 1924 joined the Scouting Fleet for winter battle practice with the combined fleets in the Caribbean, Goff returned to Norfolk, Virginia, for further exercises and on 5 January 1925 sailed for Pearl Harbor, arriving 24 April for fleet battle exercises. She returned to New York 17 July. This established pattern of coastwise exercises and fleet maneuvers was broken in the fall of 1926, as Goff and  engaged in rescue work on the Isle of Pines, Cuba, which had been devastated by the hurricane of 19–20 October. Flying in stores via Milwaukee's planes and sending their own doctors and medical supplies ashore, the two American ships gave aid to the stricken island and its predominantly American population.

After overhaul, Goff returned to the Caribbean in January 1927 with the Special Service Squadron. Civil war was underway in Nicaragua, and ships of the American fleet cruised along the coast to protect American lives and property, and to evacuate American citizens if necessary. From Nicaragua, Goff returned to her regular routine along the Atlantic coast, tactical exercises spiced by winter maneuvers in the Caribbean, a pattern to which she held for several years.

Routine was interrupted by occasional special tasks, the most notable of which came in June 1927. Goff was part of the flotilla which steamed out from the East Coast to greet and escort  and her special passenger, Charles Lindbergh, as he returned from his transatlantic flight to a hero's welcome in New York. Goff also in June 1930 carried the President-elect of Colombia from Newport, Rhode Island, to West Point. She decommissioned at the Philadelphia Navy Yard on 13 January 1931.

Recommissioning 2 March 1932, Lieutenant Commander Walter M. Wynne commanding, Goff spent the following year cruising along the East Coast training naval reserve crews. Revolution again flared up in the Caribbean, and Goff returned there 5 October 1933 to protect Americans in Cuba, where the conflict was located. Departing Cuba 2 April 1934, Goff resumed maneuvers along the East Coast until 9 November 1935, when she joined the Pacific Fleet at San Diego, California. She remained in the Pacific, operating along the coast and taking part in Hawaiian exercises, until 4 January 1939, when she departed San Diego for New York. Arriving there 20 April, Goff again cruised the East Coast training reserves until 8 September, when she entered New England waters on Neutrality Patrol.

After overhaul and refitting for European duty at New York, Goff joined Destroyer Division 55 at Ponta Delgada, Azores, on 29 June 1940 to take her place as flagship of the division. Cruising to Portugal, Goff and her division operated out of Lisbon, engaging in various exercises before returning to Norfolk 21 September.

World War II
Joining DesDiv 67 as flagship, Goff escorted  from New London, Connecticut, to Balboa, Panama Canal Zone, arriving 31 October to take up Caribbean patrol and guard duty for the Panama Canal. After America's entry into the war in December 1941, Goff remained in the Caribbean to do double duty, as both a convoy escort and patrol vessel. This area was heavily trafficked by German U-boats, and the undermanned Allied convoys (as many as 25 merchantmen with only four escorts) frequently provided easy targets. Night attacks by German submarines cost convoys which Goff was escorting a total of eight merchantmen sunk and several others seriously damaged. The destroyer was worked hard: she was out on patrol and convoy duty 10 days at a time and then in port only long enough to refuel and resupply; when this could be done at sea, it was. Escorts were at a premium as the Allies struggled to maintain their supply lines.

Goff finally had her chance to inflict real damage on the German U-boats as she left the Caribbean on 16 June 1943 and put in at New York for a long-needed overhaul. The close coordination between the carrier's planes and her destroyer screen was effective, during the period Goff was with the carrier, 27 July-9 November 1943, they made two voyages from Norfolk to Casablanca and were credited with sinking no fewer than eight U-boats. These patrols came to a dramatic conclusion when on 1 November Borie rammed and sunk a U-boat, but was herself fatally damaged in the process. For these two patrols Goff was awarded a Presidential Unit Citation (US).

After brief overhaul at New York, Goff returned to Atlantic escort duty as on 28 November she and Barry convoyed , loaded with aeronautical supplies and personnel, from Norfolk to Casablanca and then on to Reykjavík, Iceland, returning to New York on 31 December. Goff spent the first 7 months of 1944 with Albemarle, shepherding the tender safely to San Juan, Trinidad and Tobago, Casablanca, Recife, Brazil, and Avonmouth, England, before putting in at Boston, Massachusetts, on 13 July 1944 for overhaul.

Repairs completed, Goff engaged in antisubmarine practice at Casco Bay, Maine, and then on 28 August sailed for Key West, arriving 3 days later. At the Florida port she was attached to the Fleet Sound School and served in a variety of duties, including antisubmarine work, harbor guard, and target vessel for ships and planes in training. The destroyer departed Key West for Philadelphia on 9 June 1945, arriving there 2 days later.

Fate
Goff decommissioned at Philadelphia on 21 July 1945, after 24 years of service, and was struck from the Navy Register on 13 August 1945. Sold to the Boston Metal Salvage Company, Baltimore, Maryland, on 30 November 1945, she was resold to the Northern Metal Company, Philadelphia, on 30 November 1945 and later scrapped.

Awards
Goff received two battle stars for service in World War II.

References

External links
http://www.navsource.org/archives/05/247.htm

Clemson-class destroyers
World War II destroyers of the United States
Ships built by New York Shipbuilding Corporation
1920 ships